The Price is a 1924 Australian silent film made with a largely amateur cast under the direction of Dunstan Webb. It is considered a lost film.

Synopsis
Tom Howard's wealthy parents want him to become a banker but he leaves home to become a jockey. He does not do well and decides to return home, only to read that his mother and father have been killed in a motor accident. Too ashamed to collect his inheritance, he buys an old horse and works as a cab driver in Sydney. He is eventually found in a hospital by his sister who persuades him to return home, where he reconciles with his former girlfriend.

Cast
James Alexander as Tom Howard	
Muriel Copeland as sister
Doris Brooks
Belle Bates
Eddie Hamilton (jockey)
Bert Ralton and His Havana Band
Jimmy McMahon

Production
Mary Mallon formed her own company and spent less than £1,000 to make the movie. Shooting began in early 1924. The movie featured several Sydney cabarets and racing stables, including Randwick Racecourse. Some of the actors were amateurs cast from a competition.

Release
Some screenings were accompanied by Dunstan Webb, who said he would talk to any members of the audience interested in appearing in future films made by the company.

The costs were so low the film reportedly made a small profit.

References

External links

The Price at National Film and Sound Archive

1924 films
Australian drama films
Australian silent films
Australian black-and-white films
1924 drama films
Lost Australian films
1924 lost films
Lost drama films
Films directed by Dunstan Webb
Silent drama films
1920s English-language films